The Hazelwood Brewing Company is an historic former brewery which is located in the Hazelwood neighborhood of Pittsburgh, Pennsylvania.

History
The brewery opened in 1905 with a production capacity of 40,000 barrels per year and distributed its Bohemian, Pilsener, and Famous lagers throughout the region. During Prohibition, the company produced low-alcohol "near-beer," though it was raided several times for allegedly selling actual beer instead. After the end of Prohibition in 1933, the brewery was reorganized as the Hazelwood Beverage Company and then Derby Brewing Company. Derby Brewing went out of business in 1938, after which the brewery buildings were used for various purposes.

The main brewery building is constructed from brick and has three sections which consist of one, one, and four bays, respectively. The middle section has four stories plus a mezzanine, while the other two sections have three stories and a mezzanine. The southern section originally had a fourth story as well but it was destroyed by a tornado in 1998.

When built, the brewery also included an ice house, bottling building, and office. Part of the ice house is still standing but the other buildings were demolished.

References

Industrial buildings and structures on the National Register of Historic Places in Pennsylvania
Industrial buildings completed in 1905
Industrial buildings and structures in Pittsburgh
National Register of Historic Places in Pittsburgh
1905 establishments in Pennsylvania
1938 disestablishments in Pennsylvania
Beer brewing companies based in Pittsburgh
Defunct brewery companies of the United States